Đồng Huy Thái (born 7 January 1985 in Thanh Hóa, Vietnam) is a Vietnamese footballer who is a midfielder for Hà Nội T&T. He was called to Vietnamese internationals, played at the 2007 AFC Asian Cup.

References 

1985 births
Living people
Vietnamese footballers
Hanoi FC players
V.League 1 players
Vietnam international footballers
2007 AFC Asian Cup players
People from Thanh Hóa province
Association football midfielders